Orestias elegans is a species of pupfish from the family Cyprinodontidae. The type locality are small lakes among headwaters of Río Rimac, in Peru. It is part of the agassii species complex.

References 

 

elegans
Fish described in 1895
Freshwater fish of Peru